Lieutenant-Colonel Richard Fell Steble (1825 – 8 October 1899) was a Liberal Party politician.

Steble was elected MP for Scarborough at a by-election in 1884, but did not stand for re-election when the seat was reduced to one member in 1885.

References

External links
 

Liberal Party (UK) MPs for English constituencies
UK MPs 1880–1885
1835 births
1911 deaths